Garra regressus is a species of cyprinid fish in the genus Garra. It is endemic to Ethiopia.

References 

Garra
Fish of Lake Tana
Endemic fauna of Ethiopia
Fish described in 2007
Cyprinid fish of Africa